Turlough O'Hare (born July 16, 1969) is a former international freestyle swimmer who competed in two Summer Olympics for Canada: in 1988 in Seoul and 1992 in Barcelona.  His best Olympic result was eighth place with the men's 4×200-metre freestyle relay team in 1988.  His international highlights included winning the Distance Freestyle World Cup series 1989 and placing 7th at the 1990 World Aquatic Championships in the 200-metre freestyle.  He is a 37-time national champion and set eight Canadian and two Commonwealth records.

At the 1991 Summer Universiade, O'Hare won a bronze medal in the 200-metre freestyle.  At the 1993 Summer Universiade, O'Hare won two gold medals in the 400 and 800-metre freestyle, and a bronze medal in the 200-metre freestyle

See also
 List of Commonwealth Games medallists in swimming (men)

References

1969 births
Living people
Canadian male freestyle swimmers
Olympic swimmers of Canada
Swimmers at the 1988 Summer Olympics
Swimmers at the 1992 Summer Olympics
Sportspeople from British Columbia
UBC Thunderbirds swimmers
Commonwealth Games medallists in swimming
Commonwealth Games silver medallists for Canada
Swimmers at the 1990 Commonwealth Games
Universiade medalists in swimming
Universiade gold medalists for Canada
Universiade bronze medalists for Canada
Medalists at the 1991 Summer Universiade
Medalists at the 1993 Summer Universiade
Medallists at the 1990 Commonwealth Games